Paraguay competed at the 2000 Summer Olympics in Sydney, Australia.

Summary
Paraguay participated at the 2000 Summer Olympics in Sydney. Tennis player Rossana de los Ríos took part in the Women's Singles Competition, defeating Květa Peschke (6–3, 6–0) in the first round and Lindsay Davenport due to a walk-over in the second round. She then faced Jelena Dokić who eventually defeated her in the third round (7–6, 7–5). In Athletics, Nery Kennedy participated in Men's Javelin Throw and Mariana Canillas participated in Women's Discus. In the Swimming events, Antonio Leon Candia took part in the Men's 100 metre Breaststroke and Andrea Prono in the Women's 100 metre Backstroke.

Athletics

Key
Note–Ranks given for track events are within the athlete's heat only
Q = Qualified for the next round
q = Qualified for the next round as a fastest loser or, in field events, by position without achieving the qualifying target
NR = National record
N/A = Round not applicable for the event
Bye = Athlete not required to compete in round

Field

Swimming

Tennis

See also
Paraguay at the 1999 Pan American Games

References

Wallechinsky, David (2004). The Complete Book of the Summer Olympics (Athens 2004 Edition). Toronto, Canada. .
International Olympic Committee (2001). The Results. Retrieved 12 November 2005.
Sydney Organising Committee for the Olympic Games (2001). Official Report of the XXVII Olympiad Volume 1: Preparing for the Games. Retrieved 20 November 2005.
Sydney Organising Committee for the Olympic Games (2001). Official Report of the XXVII Olympiad Volume 2: Celebrating the Games . Retrieved 20 November 2005.
Sydney Organising Committee for the Olympic Games (2001). The Results . Retrieved 20 November 2005.
International Olympic Committee Web Site
sports-reference

Nations at the 2000 Summer Olympics
2000
Olympics